Westerlund 1-75 or Wd 1-75 is a red supergiant (RSG) located in the Westerlund 1 super star cluster. Its radius is calculated to be around 668 solar radii (4.65 × 108 km, 3.10 au). This corresponds to a volume 298 million times bigger than the Sun. If placed at the center of the Solar System, Westerlund 1-75 would engulf the inner limits of the asteroid belt.

The star is classified as a luminous cool supergiant emitting most of its energy in the infrared spectrum. It occupies the upper right corner of the Hertzsprung-Russell diagram.

Like  Westerlund 1-20, Westerlund 1 W26 and Westerlund 1-237, Westerlund 1-75 was observed to be a radio source, however it is weakest along the RSGs in its cluster and remains unresolved at any wavelength.

Westerlund 1-75 is surrounded by extended nebula, although it appears less massive than nebulae around typical red supergiant stars.

Notes

References 

Ara (constellation)
M-type supergiants
J16470892-4549585